Mohammed Abdullah, also known as Abu al-Baraa el-Azdi, is a Yemeni  militant and member of the Islamic State of Iraq and the Levant. Both names are noms de guerre.  He was reported to originally be a preacher who joined ISIL in Syria.

He rose to prominence in mid-November 2014 when ISIL leader Abu Bakr al-Baghdadi appointed him Emir and leader of the city of Derna in Libya, soon after the partial takeover of the city by ISIL and declaration of the Wilayah Barqah (Province of Eastern Libya). He also became the city's top religious judge.

ISIL regularly appoints foreigners to key government positions.

References

Islamic State of Iraq and the Levant members
Living people
Year of birth missing (living people)
Yemeni Islamists